The Women's Amateur Latin America Championship was founded in 2021 by The R&A and the Annika Foundation, to create an event corresponding to The Women's Amateur Championship, the U.S. Women's Amateur and the Women's Amateur Asia-Pacific for Latin America, analogous to the Latin America Amateur Championship for men.

The winner earns invitations to play in The Women's Amateur Championship in Britain and two major championships, the Women's British Open and The Evian Championship, and from 2023 also The Chevron Championship.

Winners

References

External links

R&A championships
Amateur golf tournaments
Women's golf tournaments
Golf tournaments in South America
Recurring sporting events established in 2021